Cornet is an outdoor concrete and steel sculpture of a cornet by David Adickes, located in the Strand Historic District of Galveston, Texas, in the United States. Adickes converted the prop into a freestanding sculpture for installation in Galveston in 1986.

Description and history
Cornet, designed by Native Texan artist David Adickes, is located at 23rd Street and The Strand in Galveston's Strand Historic District. Before being converted into a freestanding sculpture and installed in Galveston in 1986, the cornet served as a stage prop at the 1984 Louisiana World Exposition. Adickes' model was a "turn-of-the-century-style" cornet purchased an at antique shop in New Orleans. It features keys, a mouthpiece and spigots, and is mounted on two metal poles. Cornet was surveyed by the Smithsonian Institution's Save Outdoor Sculpture! program in 1993.

See also

 1986 in art

References

External links
 Galveston.com's Public Art Tour

1984 establishments in Louisiana
1984 Louisiana World Exposition
1986 sculptures
1986 establishments in Texas
Buildings and structures in Galveston, Texas
Concrete sculptures in Texas
Culture of Galveston, Texas
Musical instruments in art
Relocated buildings and structures in Texas
Sculptures by American artists
Steel sculptures in Texas
Tourist attractions in Galveston, Texas
World's fair sculptures